Luisa Makubanza, sometimes called Louise Makubanza (born 28 September 1992) is a Congolese handball goalkeeper. She plays for the club Primeiro de Agosto, and on the DR Congo national team. She represented DR Congo at the 2013 World Women's Handball Championship in Serbia, where DR Congo placed 20th.

References

1992 births
Living people
Democratic Republic of the Congo female handball players
Expatriate handball players
Democratic Republic of the Congo expatriates in France
Democratic Republic of the Congo expatriates in Angola
21st-century Democratic Republic of the Congo people